Rhinotragus dorsiger is a species of beetle in the family Cerambycidae. It was described by Ernst Friedrich Germar in 1824.

References

Rhinotragini
Beetles described in 1824